Mike Lima (born May 23, 1985 in Ludlow, Massachusetts) is an American soccer player who currently plays for Western Mass Pioneers in the USL Premier Development League.

Career

College and Amateur
Lima attended Ludlow High School and played college soccer at Franklin Pierce University, winning an NCAA Division II national championship in 2007.
A member of the Massachusetts Olympic Development team in 2002/2003.  A member of the Under 16/17 boys Region One Olympic Development team in 2002/2003. United States Youth National Team Pool selection in 2002/2003.  Nominated All-American/All New England honors. Awarded All-State honors in 2003.  Played two seasons for Elms College in Chicopee, Massachusetts.  Voted Northern Atlantic Conference Honorable Mention team in 2003/2004.  Nominated Player of the Year in 2004/2005.  Northern Atlantic Conference First team All-American 2004/2005.  Northern Atlantic Conference point leader 2004/2005.  Holds four all time records at Elms College; goals per season, goals per game, assist per game/season and career points.  Holds three NCAA division three season records; goals per game, assists per game and overall points in 2004/2005.  Played two seasons for the Franklin Pierce Ravens.  Led Conference in assists in 2007.  Received All-Conference award. Received NCAA All-Region first team selection in 2007.

Professional
Lima turned professional in 2008, signing with his hometown team Western Mass Pioneers, and made his pro debut on May 3, 2008 as a substitute in a 1-0 victory the Real Maryland Monarchs.

External links
Pioneers bio

References

1985 births
Living people
Franklin Pierce Ravens men's soccer players
American soccer players
USL Second Division players
USL League Two players
Western Mass Pioneers players
People from Ludlow, Massachusetts
Elms College alumni
Association football midfielders